The 2020–21 Svenska Cupen Damer was the 38th edition of the women's association football main cup competition in Sweden. BK Häcken won the competition after defeating Eskilstuna 3–0 at the final.

Format
The format for this season changed a bit, 52 teams from the Division 1 and below entered the first round via their districts instead of 80. The winners will then join the Elitettan teams at the second round, while the Damallsvenskan teams join at the third round.

The qualification round starts from June and ends in February, after which the last 16 clubs would be grouped into 4 groups of 4 teams each.

Calendar
Below are the dates for each round as given by the official schedule:

Qualification round

First round 
52 teams from the Division 1 and lower entered this round via their districts qualifications. Matches were played between 27 June and 12 August 2020.

|colspan="3" style="background-color:green3|27 June 2020

|-
|colspan="3" style="background-color:green3|26 July 2020

|-
|colspan="3" style="background-color:green3|28 July 2020

|-
|colspan="3" style="background-color:green3|1 August 2020

|-
|colspan="3" style="background-color:green3|3 August 2020

|-
|colspan="3" style="background-color:green3|4 August 2020

|-
|colspan="3" style="background-color:green3|5 August 2020

|-
|colspan="3" style="background-color:green3|11 August 2020

|-
|colspan="3" style="background-color:green3|12 August 2020

|}

Second round 
The 26 winners from the first round plus the 14 Elitettan teams played in this round. Matches were played between 26 August and 9 September 2020.

|colspan="3" style="background-color:green3|26 August 2020

|-
|colspan="3" style="background-color:green3|27 August 2020

|-
|colspan="3" style="background-color:green3|1 September 2020

|-
|colspan="3" style="background-color:green3|8 September 2020

|-
|colspan="3" style="background-color:green3|9 September 2020

|}

Third round 
The 20 winners from the second round plus the 12 Damallsvenskan teams plays in this round. All matches are scheduled to take place between 30 September and 7 October 2020.

|-
|colspan="3" style="background-color:green3|30 September 2020
|-

|-
|colspan="3" style="background-color:green3|6 October 2020

|-
|colspan="3" style="background-color:green3|7 October 2020
|-

|-
|colspan="3" style ="background-color:green3|19 November 2020
|-

|-
|colspan="3" style ="background-color:green3|28 February 2021
|-

|}

Group stage 
The last 16 teams were divided into 4 groups of 4 teams each. All matches were played in March 2021.

Group A

Group B

Group C

Group D

Knockout stage

Semi-finals

Final

Top scorers 
Not including qualifying. Updated to matches played on 4 April 2021.

References

External links 
 Svenska Cupen Damer 2020/21 at the Swedish Football Association Official website.
 Svenska Cupen Women at Soccerway

2020 in Swedish women's football
2020–21 domestic association football cups